Tyreece Tyson Nesbett Simpson (born 7 February 2002) is an English professional footballer who plays as a striker for Huddersfield Town.

Club career

Ipswich Town
Simpson joined the Ipswich Town academy in 2018, signing a 2-year scholarship. He made his senior debut for the club on 3 September 2019, featuring as a second-half substitute in a 2–1 home win over Tottenham Hotspur U23s in an EFL Trophy group stage match at Portman Road. He made his league debut on 29 February 2020 in a 1–2 away loss to Blackpool at Bloomfield Road. He signed his first professional contract with the club on 2 March 2020, signing a two year contract until the summer of 2022, with the option of a further year’s extension.

Swindon Town (loan)
On 31 July 2021, Simpson joined Swindon Town on a season-long loan deal. On 28 August 2021, Simpson scored first goal for the club in a 1-0 win over Mansfield Town. On 23 January 2022, Simpson was recalled from his season long loan deal after scoring eleven goals in thirty matches, his last match for the club seeing him open the scoring in a 1–1 draw with Bristol Rovers.

Huddersfield Town
On 1 September 2022, Simpson signed a four-year deal with EFL Championship side Huddersfield Town.

Personal life
Simpson played rugby when he was young, representing Langley School, while also participating in athletics while representing Great Yarmouth and District Athletics Club. He was offered a professional contract by rugby union club Leicester Tigers in March 2018, but turned the offer down so that he could pursue a career in football.

Career statistics

References

External links

2002 births
Living people
Sportspeople from Ipswich
English footballers
Association football forwards
Ipswich Town F.C. players
Swindon Town F.C. players
Huddersfield Town A.F.C. players
English Football League players
Black British sportspeople